was a ninth degree (kudan) judo sensei. Introducing the sport to the Dominican Republic after emigrating there in 1957, he was called "the father of Dominican judo". He was inducted into the Dominican Sports Hall of Fame in 2009.

Some notable Dominican judoka who trained with him include Juan Chalas, John Adams, and Desiderio Lebron. He is also well-known as a landscape designer, creating the Japanese garden in the Dr. Rafael Ma. Moscoso National Botanical Garden in Santo Domingo and redesigning the landscaping around the famous Monumento de Santiago.

References

External links
TV Tokyo summary of an interview done with Sensei Matsunaga that aired on Japanese television 
Mujer y Deportes tv coverage of Sensei Matsunaga's passing 

Dominican Republic male judoka
1936 births
2016 deaths
People from Kagoshima Prefecture
Dominican Republic architects